TheGATE.ca, referred to as The GATE, is a Canadian online entertainment website that reports on movies, television, music, video games, leisure travel and events, with reviews, news, and interviews.

Launched in November 2000, The GATE is owned and operated by W. Andrew Powell with contributions from a variety of writers, including author Christopher Heard, among other freelance contributors.

In 2022, The GATE celebrated more than 20 years of publishing, sharing retrospective articles and social media posts featuring videos, photos, and audio from the publication's archives. The publication also launched memberships on its website and YouTube channel. 

In June 2014, The GATE reported serving 124,000 unique visitors per month.

Major coverage highlights throughout the year include the Toronto International Film Festival, Juno Awards, the Academy Awards, and an annual series of Holiday Gift Guides.

History

Founded in 1999 as a small zine by W. Andrew Powell. The zine was available in bars and restaurants in downtown Toronto until 2003. 

The GATE covered music as the website's main focus until 2001 when the website launched. At that time, the publication expanded to cover movies, followed by television, and video games by late in 2002.

For several years, The GATE's film reviews by Powell were syndicated to publications across Canada, including Lighthouse Publishing in Nova Scotia, CFB Esquimalt Lookout newspaper in British Columbia, and The Squamish Chief  in Alberta.

Since 2001, Powell has represented The GATE as a guest entertainment expert on U8TV's Shower Hour, Much Music's Ed's Big Wham Bam, AM640's travel radio program Planes, Trains and Automobiles, Hamilton's CHAM 820 Nabuurs and Friends, and in Eye Weekly's Annual Cross-Canada Music Critics Poll.

Notably in 2011, Canadian newspaper advertising for the opening weekend of the Walt Disney Pictures release Pirates of the Caribbean: On Stranger Tides featured a quote from Powell, "Pirates is back and it's better than ever!"

On September 7, 2012, Government of Canada announced  an investment of $15,000 "through the Business Innovation component of the Canada Periodical Fund" which was used "to redesign its website, develop a marketing strategy, and expand its Canadian content."

The Government of Canada once more contributed to The GATE in 2014, through the Business Innovation component of the Canada Periodical Fund, following an announcement on March 17, 2014. A total of $19,000 was contributed for marketing efforts related to The GATE's 14th Anniversary Concert, which was held at The Great Hall in Toronto on June 26, 2014.

In November 2021, Powell was accepted into the Critics Choice Association as a voting member. 

In February 2022, The GATE unveiled a new logo and branding.

Notable interviews

 50 cent
 Colin Farrell
 Cobie Smulders
 Priyanka Chopra
 Tatiana Maslany
 Edward James Olmos
 Shawn Ashmore
 Anna Silk
 Melanie Berry, President and CEO of CARAS and MusiCounts
 Beau Bridges
 Bruce Campbell
 Tom Felton
 Terry Gilliam
 Emm Gryner
 Hugh Hefner
 Stan Lee
 Stuart McLean
 Sam Neill
 Jayde Nicole
 Mickey Rourke
 Kari Skogland
 Kevin Smith
 Brent Spiner
 Riley Steele
 Edgar Wright
 Zim Zum

Statistics

TheGATE.ca is ranked in the top 25,000 most visited websites in Canada according to Alexa.

References

External links
TheGATE.ca
The GATE's reviews on RottenTomatoes.com

2000 establishments in Ontario
Film magazines published in Canada
Canadian news websites
Canadian music websites
Magazines established in 2000
Magazines published in Toronto